John Joshua Proby, 1st Earl of Carysfort, KP, PC, PC (Ire), FRS (12 August 1751 – 7 April 1828) was a British judge, diplomat, Whig politician and poet.

Background and education
Carysfort was the son of John Proby, 1st Baron Carysfort, and the Hon. Elizabeth, daughter of Joshua Allen, 2nd Viscount Allen. He was educated at Westminster School and Trinity College, Cambridge.

Political and judicial career
Carysfort succeeded his father as second Baron in 1772. He was elected a Fellow of the Royal Society in 1779 and made a Knight of the Order of St Patrick in 1784. In 1789 he was admitted to the Irish Privy Council, created Earl of Carysfort in the Peerage of Ireland and appointed Joint Master of the Rolls in Ireland, which he remained until 1801. The office was then generally regarded as a sinecure. In February 1790 he was returned to the House of Commons for East Looe, a seat he held until June the same year, and then represented Stamford until 1801. He was also Envoy to Berlin between 1800 and 1802. On 18 February 1793, he was appointed a deputy lieutenant of Northamptonshire.

In 1801 he was created Baron Carysfort, of the Hundred of Norman Cross in the County of Huntingdon, in the Peerage of the United Kingdom, which gave him a seat in the British House of Lords. He served as a Commissioner of the Board of Control and as Joint Postmaster General under Lord Grenville from 1806 to 1807 and was sworn of the British Privy Council in 1806.

In 1810 Carysfort published Dramatic and Narrative Poems.

Family

Lord Carysfort lived at Elton Hall, Huntingdonshire, which he inherited from his father. He married, firstly, Elizabeth Osbourne, daughter of Sir William Osborne, 8th Baronet, in 1774. They had three sons and one daughter. After Elizabeth's early death in 1783 he married, secondly, Elizabeth Grenville, daughter of Prime Minister George Grenville, in 1787. They had three daughters. Lord Carysfort died in April 1828, aged 76, and was predeceased by his eldest son, William, being succeeded in his titles by his second but eldest surviving son John. Lady Carysfort died in December 1842, aged 86.

References

1751 births
1828 deaths
People educated at Westminster School, London
Alumni of Trinity College, Cambridge
Whig (British political party) MPs for English constituencies
Members of the Parliament of Great Britain for constituencies in Cornwall
Members of the Parliament of Great Britain for English constituencies
British MPs 1790–1796
British MPs 1796–1800
Members of the Privy Council of Ireland
Members of the Privy Council of the United Kingdom
United Kingdom Postmasters General
Deputy Lieutenants of Northamptonshire
Knights of St Patrick
Fellows of the Royal Society
Masters of the Rolls in Ireland
UK MPs 1801–1802
Carysfort, E1
UK MPs who were granted peerages
Earls of Carysfort